Hans Berthel (1914  2003) was a German art director active in the West German film industry. During the Second World War he served in the Luftwaffe, spending time as a prisoner of war in Canada.

Selected filmography

References

Bibliography
 Patrick Lucanio & Gary Coville. Smokin' Rockets: The Romance of Technology in American Film, Radio and Television, 1945-1962. McFarland, 2002.

External links

1914 births
2003 deaths
German art directors
Film people from Nuremberg